M. Durai is an Indian politician and former Member of Parliament elected from Tamil Nadu. He was elected to the Lok Sabha from Vandavasi constituency as a Pattali Makkal Katchi candidate in 1998 and 1999 elections.

Positions Held:

References 

Living people
India MPs 1998–1999
India MPs 1999–2004
Lok Sabha members from Tamil Nadu
Pattali Makkal Katchi politicians
People from Tiruvannamalai district
Year of birth missing (living people)